Bracon is a genus of wasps in the Braconidae, a family of parasitoid wasps. There are several hundred described species but there are thousands still undescribed. The genus is cosmopolitan, distributed throughout the world, with most of the described species occurring in the Palearctic realm.

These wasps are mostly ectoparasitoids, with the larvae developing on the outside of the body of the host. Recorded hosts include the larvae of many species of lepidopterans, beetles, flies, hymenopterans, and true bugs. They are idiobionts, halting the development of the host when they lay eggs on its body. Some Bracon wasps are specific to one host species, and some are known to utilize many different hosts. The eggs of the wasp can be very hardy. In one report, Bracon wasps oviposited on tortrix moth larvae, which then entered privet seeds and were consumed by birds along with the fruit. The wasp eggs were later excreted and the larvae emerged.

This large genus has been divided into several subgenera, some of which are further divided into species-groups. A DNA analysis showed that the genus is paraphyletic, that its subgenera and other defined groups are not all valid on a molecular basis, and that revising it into informal groups would be more practical. Other authors still divide the genus into subgenera using morphological characters to make identification easier.

Most of the thousands of species that fit into this genus have not yet been described, but even the number of named species is unclear, with estimates ranging from 500 to 1000.

Species include:

Bracon acrobasidis   
Bracon agathymi    
Bracon americanus     
Bracon analcidis   
Bracon angelesius  
Bracon apicatus 
Bracon argutator  
Bracon bembeciae    
Bracon brachyurus   
Bracon brevicornis 
Bracon canadensis   
Bracon caulicola
Bracon cephi   
Bracon cinctus 
Bracon connecticutorum   
Bracon cuscutae   
Bracon cushmani
Bracon erucarum     
Bracon furtivus 
Bracon gastroideae 
Bracon gelechiae   
Bracon gemmaecola
Bracon geraei 
Bracon gossypii
Bracon gracilis  
Bracon hebetor
Bracon helianthi
Bracon hemimenae 
Bracon hobomok
Bracon hyslopi 
Bracon jani
Bracon kirkpatricki
Bracon konkapoti  
Bracon laemosacci   
Bracon lineatellae    
Bracon lissogaster    
Bracon lutus 
Bracon mellitor   
Bracon metacomet   
Bracon minutator   
Bracon montowesi   
Bracon nanus   
Bracon nevadensis
Bracon niger   
Bracon nuperus
Bracon oenotherae   
Bracon palliventris  
Bracon papaipemae
Bracon pascuensis  
Bracon piceiceps    
Bracon piger 
Bracon pini  
Bracon podunkorum 
Bracon predatorius Ranjith & Quicke, 2022 
Bracon quinnipiacorum   
Bracon radicis  
Bracon rhyssomati
Bracon rosaceani   
Bracon rufomarginatus 
Bracon sanninoideae 
Bracon scanticorum
Bracon sesiae  
Bracon sphenophori   
Bracon sulcifrons  
Bracon tachypteri   
Bracon tenuiceps   
Bracon tenuis 
Bracon terebella 
Bracon tychii    
Bracon uncas 
Bracon variabilis 
Bracon vulgaris
Bracon wawequa  
Bracon xanthonotus

References

External links
Ward, D. F. 2014. Bracon: Images and Factsheets. In: Braconidae of New Zealand. Landcare Research.

Braconidae genera
Braconinae